This is a compilation of every international soccer game played by the United States men's national soccer team from 2000 through 2009. It includes the team's record for that year, each game and the date played. It also lists the U.S. goal scorers.

The format is: home team listed first, U.S. listed first at home or neutral site.

Records are in win–loss–tie format. Games decided in penalty kicks are counted as ties, as per the FIFA standard.

2000

2001

2002

2003

2004

2005

2006

2007

2008

2009

See also
United States at the FIFA World Cup
United States at the FIFA Confederations Cup
United States at the CONCACAF Gold Cup
United States at the Copa América

External links
 USA Men's National Team: All-time Results, 1990-present
 U.S. SOCCER FEDERATION 2016 MEN’S NATIONAL TEAM MEDIA GUIDE

2000
2000 in American soccer
2001 in American soccer
2002 in American soccer
2003 in American soccer
2004 in American soccer
2005 in American soccer
2006 in American soccer
2007 in American soccer
2008 in American soccer
2009 in American soccer